Leonard Lee Bailey (1942–2019) was an American surgeon who garnered international media attention in 1984 for transplanting a baboon's heart into a human infant.

Bailey was born on August 28, 1942, in Takoma Park, Maryland. In 1964, he graduated from Columbia Union College, and he earned a medical degree from Loma Linda University, School of Medicine in 1969. During the 1970s, during his residency at Toronto's Hospital for Sick Children, Bailey observed that many children died from congenital heart diseases. This led him to return to Loma Linda University in 1976 as assistant professor at the School of Medicine. There he performed more than 200 experimental heart transplants on young mammals so he could see if there was the possibility of transplantation in young mammals.

On October 26, 1984, Bailey and his team at Loma Linda University Medical Center transplanted a baboon's heart into Baby Fae, as she became known to the media. This was supported by many, but it caused a lot of controversy on many groups because it was considered unethical. Baby Fae died 21 days later. Her case is still discussed to this day. She died at age 32 days.

In 1988, Bailey received the American Academy of Achievement's Golden Plate Award presented by Awards Council member Michael DeBakey at a ceremony in Nashville, Tennessee.

Bailey became recognized for transplantation and all types of pediatric and infant-open heart surgeries.
Bailey died on May 12, 2019, of neck and throat cancer.

References 

American Seventh-day Adventists
Seventh-day Adventists in health science
Physicians from Maryland
20th-century surgeons
20th-century American physicians
1942 births
2019 deaths
People from Takoma Park, Maryland
Loma Linda University alumni
American transplant surgeons
Deaths from cancer in California
Deaths from throat cancer